Sugluk is an Inuktitut term that translates to "skinny people".  It may refer to:
Salluit, an Inuit community in northern Quebec formerly named Sugluk
Sugluk Inlet, a body of water in northern Quebec
Sugluk (band), an all-Inuit rock band from Salluit